Bartolomé Sebastián de Aroitia (died 14 April 1568) was a Roman Catholic prelate who served as Archbishop of Tarragona (1567–1568) and Bishop of Patti (1549–1567).

Biography
On 9 January 1549, Bartolomé Sebastián de Aroitia was appointed by Pope Paul III as Bishop of Patti. On 24 February 1549, he was ordained bishop by Girolamo de Terminis, Bishop of Mazara del Vallo. On 1 October 1567, he was appointed by Pope Pius V as Archbishop of Tarragona. He served as Archbishop of Tarragona until his death on 14 April 1568.

References

External links and additional sources
 (for Chronology of Bishops) 
 (for Chronology of Bishops) 

1568 deaths
16th-century Roman Catholic bishops in Spain
Bishops appointed by Pope Paul III
Bishops appointed by Pope Pius V